Seetharatnam Gari Abbayi is 1992 Indian Telugu-language drama film directed by E. V. V. Satyanarayana starring Vanisri, Vinod Kumar and Roja.

Cast
 Vanisri as Sita Ratnam
 Vinod Kumar as Vamsi
 Roja as Manga
 Kaikala Satyanarayana as Sita Ratnam's husband
 Brahmanandam as Veterinary doctor Theddu Samaram
 Kota Srinivasa Rao as Garapati Bullabbayi
 Babu Mohan as Sattipandu
 Srikanth
 Nirmalamma
 Ali as compounder
 Jit Mohan Mitra

Soundtrack

References

External links
 Seetharatnam Gari Abbayi film on Youtube

1992 films
1990s romantic comedy-drama films
Indian romantic comedy-drama films
Films directed by E. V. V. Satyanarayana
Films scored by Raj–Koti
1990s Telugu-language films
Telugu films remade in other languages